The 1919 North Londonderry by-election was held on 4 March 1919.  The by-election was held due to the resignation of the incumbent Irish Unionist MP, Hugh Anderson.  It was won by the Irish Unionist candidate Hugh T. Barrie. Barrie's Sinn Féin opponent, Patrick McGilligan, would later become Irish Minister for External Affairs.

References

1919 elections in the United Kingdom
By-elections to the Parliament of the United Kingdom in County Londonderry constituencies
20th century in County Londonderry
1919 elections in Ireland